Istalla (possibly from Quechua for a quadrangular, woven or knitted multi-colored piece of clothing to carry coca leaves) is a mountain in the Andes of Peru, about  high, situated in the Vilcanota mountain range south east of Cusco. It is located in the Cusco Region, Canchis Province, Pitumarca District, and in the Quispicanchi Province, Marcapata District. Istalla lies northeast of the mountain Condoriquiña.

References

Mountains of Cusco Region
Mountains of Peru